A loom is a device used to weave cloth and tapestry. The basic purpose of any loom is to hold the warp threads under tension to facilitate the interweaving of the weft threads. The precise shape of the loom and its mechanics may vary, but the basic function is the same.

Etymology and usage
The word "loom" derives from the Old English geloma, formed from ge- (perfective prefix) and loma, a root of unknown origin; the whole word geloma meant a utensil, tool, or machine of any kind.  In 1404 "lome" was used to mean a machine to enable weaving thread into cloth.
By 1838 "loom" had gained the additional meaning of a machine for interlacing thread.

Weaving Loom

Weaving is done by intersecting the longitudinal threads, the warp, i.e. the ones stretched on the loom (from the Proto-Indo-European *werp, "to bend") with the transverse threads, the weft, i.e. "that which is woven".

The major components of the loom are the warp beam, heddles, harnesses or shafts (as few as two, four is common, sixteen not unheard of), shuttle, reed and takeup roll. In the loom, yarn processing includes shedding, picking, battening and taking-up operations. These are the principal motions.

Shedding. Shedding is the raising of part of the warp yarn to form a shed (the vertical space between the raised and unraised warp yarns), through which the filling yarn, carried by the shuttle, can be inserted, forming the weft. On the modern loom, simple and intricate shedding operations are performed automatically by the heddle or heald frame, also known as a harness. This is a rectangular frame to which a series of wires, called heddles or healds, are attached. The yarns are passed through the eye holes of the heddles, which hang vertically from the harnesses. The weave pattern determines which harness controls which warp yarns, and the number of harnesses used depends on the complexity of the weave. Two common methods of controlling the heddles are dobbies and a Jacquard Head.

Picking. As the harnesses raise the heddles or healds, which raise the warp yarns, the shed is created. The filling yarn is inserted through the shed by a small carrier device called a shuttle. The shuttle is normally pointed at each end to allow passage through the shed. In a traditional shuttle loom, the filling yarn is wound onto a quill, which in turn is mounted in the shuttle. The filling yarn emerges through a hole in the shuttle as it moves across the loom. A single crossing of the shuttle from one side of the loom to the other is known as a pick. As the shuttle moves back and forth across the shed, it weaves an edge, or selvage, on each side of the fabric to prevent the fabric from raveling.
Battening. Between the heddles and the takeup roll, the warp threads pass through another frame called the reed (which resembles a comb). The portion of the fabric that has already been formed but not yet rolled up on the takeup roll is called the fell. After the shuttle moves across the loom laying down the fill yarn, the weaver uses the reed to press (or batten) each filling yarn against the fell. Conventional shuttle looms can operate at speeds of about 150 to 160 picks per minute.

There are two secondary motions, because with each weaving operation the newly constructed fabric must be wound on a cloth beam. This process is called taking up. At the same time, the warp yarns must be let off or released from the warp beams. To become fully automatic, a loom needs a tertiary motion, the filling stop motion. This will brake the loom if the weft thread breaks. An automatic loom requires 0.125 hp to 0.5 hp to operate.

Frames
Loom frames can be roughly divided by to the orientation of the warp threads, into horizontal looms and vertical looms. There are many finer divisions.

The earliest evidence of a horizontal loom is found on a pottery dish in ancient Egypt, dated to 4400 BC. It was a frame loom, equipped with treadles to lift the warp threads, leaving the weaver's hands free to pass and beat the weft thread.

Handlooms have a variety of frame shapes, including the simple frame loom, pit loom, free-standing loom, and the pegged loom. Each of these can be constructed fairly simply; they provide work and income in developing economies. A pit loom has a pit for the treadles, reducing the stress transmitted through the much shorter frame.

Back strap loom

The back strap loom (also known as belt loom) is a simple loom that has its roots in ancient civilizations. Andean textiles, still made today with the back strap loom, originated thousands of years ago with the same back strap loom process. It consists of two sticks or bars between which the warps are stretched. One bar is attached to a fixed object and the other to the weaver, usually by means of a strap around the back. The weaver leans back and uses their body weight to tension the loom. On traditional looms, the two main sheds are operated by means of a shed roll over which one set of warps pass, and continuous string heddles which encase each of the warps in the other set. To open the shed controlled by the string heddles, the weaver relaxes tension on the warps and raises the heddles. The other shed is usually opened by simply drawing the shed roll toward the weaver.

Both simple and complex textiles can be woven on this loom. Width is limited to how far the weaver can reach from side to side to pass the shuttle. Warp faced textiles, often decorated with intricate pick-up patterns woven in complementary and supplementary warp techniques are woven by indigenous peoples today around the world. They produce such things as belts, ponchos, bags, hatbands and carrying cloths. Supplementary weft patterning and brocading is practiced in many regions. Balanced weaves are also possible on the backstrap loom. Today, commercially produced backstrap loom kits often include a rigid heddle.

Warp-weighted loom

The warp-weighted loom is a vertical loom that may have originated in the Neolithic period. The earliest evidence of warp-weighted looms comes from sites belonging to the Starčevo culture in modern Serbia and Hungary and from late Neolithic sites in Switzerland. This loom was used in Ancient Greece, and spread north and west throughout Europe thereafter. Its defining characteristic is hanging weights (loom weights) which keep bundles of the warp threads taut. Frequently, extra warp thread is wound around the weights. When a weaver has reached the bottom of the available warp, the completed section can be rolled around the top beam, and additional lengths of warp threads can be unwound from the weights to continue. This frees the weaver from vertical size constraint.

Treadle loom

In a wooden vertical-shaft loom, the heddles are fixed in place in the shaft. The warp threads pass alternately through a heddle, and through a space between the heddles (the shed), so that raising the shaft raises half the threads (those passing through the heddles), and lowering the shaft lowers the same threads — the threads passing through the spaces between the heddles remain in place. This was invented in the 13th century. 

A treadle loom for figured weaving may have a large number of harnesses or a control head. It can, for instance, have a Jacquard machine attached to it .

Tapestry looms

Tapestry can have extremely complex wefts, as differnent strands of wefts of different colours are used to form the pattern. Speed is lower, and shedding and picking devices may be simpler.

Ribbon, Band, and Inkle weaving

Inkle looms are narrow looms used for narrow work. They are used to make narrow warp-faced strips such as ribbons, bands, or tape. They are often quite small; some are used on a tabletop. others are backstraps looms with a rigid heddle, and very portable.

Darning looms

There exist very small hand-held looms known as darning looms. They are made to fit under the fabric being mended, and are often held in place by an elastic band on one side of the cloth and a groove around the loom's darning-egg portion on the other. They may have heddles made of flip-flopping rotating hooks . Other devices sold as darning looms are just a darning egg and a separate comb-like piece with teeth to hook the warp over; these are used for repairing knitted garments and are like a linear knitting spool. Darning looms were sold  during Word War Two clothing rationing in the United Kingdom and Canada, and some are homemade.

Circular handlooms

Circular looms are used to create seamless tubes of fabric for products such as hosiery, sacks, clothing, fabric hoses (such as fire hoses) and the like. Tablet weaving can be used to knit tubes, including tubes that split and join. 

Small jigs also used for circular knitting can be used as circular looms.

Shedding methods

It is possible to weave by manually threading the weft over and under the warp threads, but this is slow. Some tapestry techniques use manual shedding. Pin looms and peg looms also generally have no shedding devices. Pile carpets generally don't use shedding for the pile, because each pile thread is individually knotted onto the warps, but there may be shedding for the weft holding the carpet together.

Usually weaving uses shedding devices. These devices pull some of the warp threads to each side, so that a shed is formed between them, and the weft is passed through the shed. There are a variety of methods for forming the shed. At least two sheds must be formed, the shed and the countershed. Two sheds is enough for tabby weave; more complex weaves, such as twill weaves, satin weaves, diaper weaves, and figured (picture-forming) weaves, require more sheds.

Shed-rod

A shed-rod is simply a stick woven through the warp threads. When pulled perpendicular to the threads, it creates a shed. To create the counter-shed, a heddle-bar is usually used.

Heddle-bar

A heddle-bar is simply a stick placed across the warp and tied to individual warp threads. When it is lifted, it pulls the warp threads it is tied to out of position, creating a shed.

A warp-weighted loom (see diagram) typically uses a heddle-bar. It has two upright posts (C); they support a horizontal beam (D), which is cylindrical so that the finished cloth can be rolled around it, allowing the loom to be used to weave a piece of cloth taller than the loom, and preserving an ergonomic working height. The warp threads (F, and A and B) hang from the beam and rest against the shed rod (E). The heddle-bar (G) is tied to some of the warp threads (A, but not B), usign loops of string called leashes (H). So when the heddle rod is pulled out and placed in the forked sticks protruding from the posts (not lettered, no technical term given in citation), the shed (1) is replaced by the counter-shed (2). By passing the weft through the shed and the counter-shed, alternately, cloth is woven.

Heddle-rods are used on modern tapestry looms.

Tablet weaving

Tablet weaving uses cards punched with holes. The warp threads pass through the holes, and the cards are twisted and shifted to created varied sheds. This shedding technique is used for narrow work. It is also used to finish edges, weaving decorative selvage bands instead of hemming.

Rotating-hook heddles

There are heddles made of flip-flopping rotating hooks, which raise and lower the warp, creating sheds. The hooks, when vertical, have the weft threads looped around them horizontally. If the hooks are flopped over on side or another, the loop of weft twists, raising one or the other side of the loop, which creates the shed and countershed.

Rigid heddles

Rigid heddles are generally used on single-shaft looms. Odd warp threads go through the slots, and even ones through the circular holes, or vice-versa. The shed is formed by lifting the heddle, and the countershed by depressing it. The warp threads in the slots stay where they are, and the once in the circular holes are pulled back and forth. A single rigid heddle can hold all the warp threads, though sometimes multiple rigid heddles are used. 

Treadles may be used to drive the rigid heddle up and down.

Multiple heddles

Rigid heddles (above) are called "rigid" to distinguish them from string and metal heddles, where each warp thread has its own heddle, which has an eye at each end and one in the middle for the warp thread. The eyes in the ends are fastened to a shaft, all in a row. This requires multiple shafts; it cannot be done on a single-shaft loom. The different shafts (also called harnesses) must be controlled by some mechanism.

While non-rigid heddles generally mean that two shafts are needed even for a plain tabby weave, twill weaves require three or more (depending on the type of twill), and more complex figured weaves require still more harnesses.

Treadle-controlled looms
Treadle looms can control multiple harnessess with multiple treadles. The weaver selects which harnesses are engaged with their feet. One treadle may be connected to more than one harness, and any number of treadles can be engaged at once, meaning that the number of different sheds that can be selected is two to the power of the number of treadles. Eight is a large but reasonable number of treadles, giving a maximum of 28=256 sheds (some of which will not have enough threads on one side to be useful). The weaver must remember the sequence of treadling needed to produce the pattern.

Figure harness and the drawloom

A drawloom is for weaving figured cloth. In a drawloom, a "figure harness" is used to control each warp thread separately, allowing very complex patterns. A drawloom requires two operators, the weaver, and an assistant called a "drawboy" to manage the figure harness. 

The earliest confirmed drawloom fabrics come from the State of Chu and date c. 400 BC. Some scholars speculate an independent invention in ancient Syria, since drawloom fabrics found in Dura-Europas are thought to date before 256 AD. The draw loom was invented in China during the Han Dynasty (State of Liu?); foot-powered multi-harness looms and jacquard looms were used for silk weaving and embroidery, both of which were cottage industries with imperial workshops. The drawloom enhanced and sped up the production of silk and played a significant role in Chinese silk weaving. The loom was introduced to Persia, India, and Europe.

Dobby head

A dobby head is a device that replaces the drawboy, the weaver's helper who used to control the warp threads by pulling on draw threads. "Dobby" is a corruption of "draw boy". Mechanical dobbies pull on the draw threads using pegs in bars to lift a set of levers. The placement of the pegs determines which levers are lifted. The sequence of bars (they are strung together) effectively remembers the sequence for the weaver. Computer-controlled dobbies use solenoids instead of pegs.

Jacquard head

The Jacquard loom is a mechanical loom, invented by Joseph Marie Jacquard in 1801, which simplifies the process of manufacturing figured textiles with complex patterns such as brocade, damask and matelasse. The loom is controlled by punched cards with punched holes, each row of which corresponds to one row of the design. Multiple rows of holes are punched on each card and the many cards that compose the design of the textile are strung together in order. It is based on earlier inventions by the Frenchmen Basile Bouchon (1725), Jean Baptiste Falcon (1728) and Jacques Vaucanson (1740). To call it a loom is a misnomer, a Jacquard head could be attached to a power loom or a handloom, the head controlling which warp thread was raised during shedding. Multiple shuttles could be used to control the colour of the weft during picking.  The Jacquard loom is the predecessor to the computer punched card readers of the 19th and 20th centuries.

Picking (weft insertion)

The weft may be passed across the shed as a ball of yarn, but usually this is too bulky and unergonomic. Shuttles are designed to be slim, so they pass through the shed; to carry a lot of yarn, so the weaver doesn't need to refill them too often; and to be an ergonomic size and shape for the particular weaver, loom, and yarn. They may also be designed for low friction.

Stick shuttles

Unnotched stick shuttles
At their simplest, these are just sticks wrapped with yarn. They may be specially shaped, as with the bobbins and bones used in tapestry-making (bobbins are used on vertical warps, and bones on horizontal ones).

Notched stick shuttles, rag shuttles, and ski shuttles

Boat shuttles
Boat shuttles may be closed (central hollow with a solid bottom) or open (central hole goes right through). The yarn may be side-feed or end-feed. They are commonly made for 10-cm (4-inch) and 15-cm (6-inch) bobbin lengths.

Flying shuttle

Hand weavers who threw a shuttle could only weave a cloth as wide as their armspan. If cloth needed to be wider, two people would do the task (often this would be an adult with a child). John Kay (1704–1779) patented the flying shuttle in 1733. The weaver held a picking stick that was attached by cords to a device at both ends of the shed. With a flick of the wrist, one cord was pulled and the shuttle was propelled through the shed to the other end with considerable force, speed and efficiency. A flick in the opposite direction and the shuttle was propelled back. A single weaver had control of this motion but the flying shuttle could weave much wider fabric than an arm's length at much greater speeds than had been achieved with the hand thrown shuttle.

The flying shuttle was one of the key developments in weaving that helped fuel the Industrial Revolution. The whole picking motion no longer relied on manual skill and it was just a matter of time before it could be powered by something other than a human.

Weft insertion in power looms

Different types of power looms are most often defined by the way that the weft, or pick, is inserted into the warp. Many advances in weft insertion have been made in order to make manufactured cloth more cost effective. Weft insertion rate is a limiting factor in production speed. , industrial looms can weave at 2,000 weft insertions per minute. 

There are five main types of weft insertion and they are as follows:
 Shuttle: The first-ever powered looms were shuttle-type looms. Spools of weft are unravelled as the shuttle travels across the shed. This is very similar to projectile methods of weaving, except that the weft spool is stored on the shuttle. These looms are considered obsolete in modern industrial fabric manufacturing because they can only reach a maximum of 300 picks per minute.
 Air jet: An air-jet loom uses short quick bursts of compressed air to propel the weft through the shed in order to complete the weave. Air jets are the fastest traditional method of weaving in modern manufacturing and they are able to achieve up to 1,500 picks per minute. However, the amounts of compressed air required to run these looms, as well as the complexity in the way the air jets are positioned, make them more costly than other looms. 
 Water jet: Water-jet looms use the same principle as air-jet looms, but they take advantage of pressurized water to propel the weft. The advantage of this type of weaving is that water power is cheaper where water is directly available on site. Picks per minute can reach as high as 1,000. 
 Rapier loom: This type of weaving is very versatile, in that rapier looms can weave using a large variety of threads.  There are several types of rapiers, but they all use a hook system attached to a rod or metal band to pass the pick across the shed. These machines regularly reach 700 picks per minute in normal production.
 Projectile: Projectile looms utilize an object that is propelled across the shed, usually by spring power, and is guided across the width of the cloth by a series of reeds. The projectile is then removed from the weft fibre and it is returned to the opposite side of the machine so it can be reused. Multiple projectiles are in use in order to increase the pick speed. Maximum speeds on these machines can be as high as 1,050 ppm.
 Circular:  Modern circular looms use up to ten shuttles, driven in a circular motion from below by electromagnets, for the weft yarns, and cams to control the warp threads. The warps rise and fall with each shuttle passage, unlike the common practice of lifting all of them at once. Circular looms are used to create seamless tubes of fabric for products such as hosiery, sacks, clothing, fabric hoses (such as fire hoses) and the like.

Battening

The newest weft thread must be beaten against the fell. Battening can be done with a long stick placed in the shed parallel to the weft (a sword batten), a shorter stick threaded between the warp threads perpendicular to warp and weft (a pin batten), a comb, or a reed (a comb with both ends closed, so that it has to be sleyed, that is have the warp threads threaded through it, when the loom is warped). For rigid-heddle looms, the heddle may be used as a reed.

Secondary motions

Dandy mechanism

Patented in 1802, dandy looms automatically rolled up the finished cloth, keeping the fell always the same length. They significantly speeded up hand weaving (still a major part of the textile industry in the 1800s). Similar mechanisms were used in power looms.

Temples

The temples act to keep the cloth from shrinking sideways as it is woven. Some warp-weighted looms had temples made of loom weights, suspended by strings so that they pulled the cloth breadthwise. Other looms may have temples tied to the frame, or temples that are hooks with an adjustable shaft between them. Power looms may use temple cylinders. Pins can leave a series of holes in the selvages (these may be from stenter pins used in post-processing).

Handlooms to power looms

A power loom is a loom powered by a source of energy other than the weaver's muscles. When power looms were developed, other looms came to be referred to as handlooms. Most cloth is now woven on power looms, but some is still woven on handlooms.

The development of power looms was gradual. The capabilities of power looms gradually expanded, but handlooms remained the most cost-effective way to make some types of textiles for most of the 18-hundreds. Many improvements in loom mechanisms were first applied to hand looms (like the dandy loom), and only later integrated into power looms.

Edmund Cartwright built and patented a power loom in 1785, and it was this that was adopted by the nascent cotton industry in England. The silk loom made by Jacques Vaucanson in 1745 operated on the same principles but was not developed further. The invention of the flying shuttle by John Kay allow a hand weaver to weave broadwoven cloth without an assistant, and was also critical to the development of a commercially successful power loom. Cartwright's loom was impractical but the ideas behind it were developed by numerous inventors in the Manchester area of England where, by 1818, there were 32 factories containing 5,732 looms.

The Horrocks loom was viable, but it was the Roberts Loom in 1830 that marked the turning point. Incremental changes to the three motions continued to be made. The problems of sizing, stop-motions, consistent take-up, and a temple to maintain the width remained. In 1841, Kenworthy and Bullough produced the Lancashire Loom which was self-acting or semi-automatic. This enables a youngster to run six looms at the same time. Thus, for simple calicos, the power loom became more economical to run than the handloom – with complex patterning that used a dobby or Jacquard head, jobs were still put out to handloom weavers until the 1870s. Incremental changes were made such as the Dickinson Loom, culminating in the Keighley-born inventor Northrop, who was working for the Draper Corporation in Hopedale producing the fully automatic Northrop Loom. This loom recharged the shuttle when the pirn was empty. The Draper E and X models became the leading products from 1909. They were challenged by synthetic fibres such as rayon. 

By 1942, faster, more efficient, and shuttleless Sulzer and rapier looms had been introduced.

Symbolism and cultural significance 

The loom is a symbol of cosmic creation and the structure upon which individual destiny is woven. This symbolism is encapsulated in the classical myth of Arachne who was changed into a spider by the goddess Athena, who was jealous of her skill at the godlike craft of weaving. In Maya civilization the goddess Ixchel taught the first woman how to weave at the beginning of time.

Gallery

See also
Bunkar: The Last of the Varanasi Weavers (documentary film)
Fashion and Textile Museum
Textile manufacturing
Timeline of clothing and textiles technology
Weaving (mythology)

References

Bibliography

External links

 Loom demonstration video
 "Caring for your loom" article
 "The Art and History of Weaving"
 The Medieval Technology Pages: "The Horizontal Loom"

Articles containing video clips
Egyptian inventions
Han dynasty
Machines
Textile industry
Textile engineering
Weaving equipment
k